Sułkowski (feminine: Sułkowska) is a Polish-language surname associated with the Polish noble Sułkowski family.  Russified version: Sulkovsky.

Notable people with this surname include:

Alexander Joseph Sulkowski (1695–1762), a Saxon-Polish general
  (1735–1796), Polish Chancellor of the Crown
Antoni Paweł Sułkowski (1785–1836), Polish division general 
David Sulkovsky (born 1978), German professional ice hockey player
Joseph Sulkowski, (c.1770–1798), Polish captain, aide de camp to Bonaparte
Łukasz Sułkowski (born 1972), Polish professor of economic sciences

Polish-language surnames